Nia-Malika Henderson (born July 7, 1974) is a senior political reporter for CNN. She reported broadly on the 2016 campaign for CNN's digital and television platforms, with a special focus on identity politics—exploring the dynamics of demographics, race, and religion, and reporting on the groups of people who help shape national elections.

Early life and education 
Henderson graduated from Lower Richland High School in Hopkins, South Carolina in 1992. She went on to graduate cum laude from Duke University with a bachelor's degree in literature and cultural anthropology; and earned master's degrees from Yale University in American studies and Columbia University in journalism.

Career 
Henderson began her career writing for The Baltimore Sun and then for Newsday'''s national staff where she was its lead reporter covering Barack Obama's 2008 campaign, the Democratic primary race and the Democratic National Convention. She also covered the first two years of the Obama administration for Politico.

From 2010 to 2015, Henderson served as a reporter at The Washington Post. As national political reporter for the Post, she covered the White House, the 2012 presidential campaign, the 2010 mid-term elections and anchored the Post'''s Election 2012 blog.

In 2015, Henderson joined CNN as senior political reporter and anchor.

Personal life
Henderson married her long-time girlfriend, a doctor, in late 2019.

References

1974 births
African-American women journalists
African-American journalists
American political journalists
CNN people
Columbia University Graduate School of Journalism alumni
Duke University alumni
LGBT African Americans
American LGBT broadcasters
American LGBT journalists
LGBT people from South Carolina
Living people
Newsday people
People from Hopkins, South Carolina
The Baltimore Sun people
The Washington Post people
Yale University alumni